Astanga or Ashtanga (aṣṭāṅga) is a Sanskrit compound translating to "having eight limbs or components".
It may refer to:
 Ashtanga (eight limbs of yoga), the eight limbs of yoga as defined by Patanjali in his Yoga Sutras
 Raja yoga, Vivekananda's popularisation of Ashtanga Yoga
 Ashtanga vinyasa yoga, a style of asana-based modern yoga founded and developed by K. Pattabhi Jois
 Ayurveda, the ancient Indian system of medicine, divided into eight limbs